Saudi Electricity Company (SEC) is the Saudi electric energy company. It enjoys a monopoly on the generation, transmission and distribution of electric power in Saudi Arabia through 45 power generation plants in the country. In 2019 SEC was ranked by Forbes as the 5th largest company in the Kingdom, and the 578 worldwide, with total annual sales of $17.1 billion .

The company was formed in 2000 by Order of the Council of Ministers through a merger of existing regional electricity companies in the Central, Eastern, Western and Southern regions into a single joint stock company. In 2009, the Electricity and Co-generation Regulatory Authority (ECRA) announced its intention to split the company into four generation companies and separate transmission and distribution companies to encourage competition in the domestic utilities sector. A transmission company – National Grid SA – was established in 2012 to operate the national grid.

In 2014, ECRA was said to have hired advisors on the break-up of the company. ECRA also confirmed the new generation companies will be open to foreign investment.

The company is 81.24 percent owned by the government, both directly (74.31 percent) and through Saudi Aramco (6.93 percent).

SEC plans to expand its power generation capacity from 60 GW to 91 GW by 2020 and more than double the existing capacity over the long term to meet demand.

In 2015, SEC, Taqnia Energy and King Abdulaziz City for Science and Technology (KACST) agreed to collaborate to build and operate the first standalone solar power station in the country.

Net profit for the second quarter of the year reached SAR5.5 million, down by 5.6% compared to SAR5.8 million a year ago, the company said in a statement on the Saudi Stock Exchange (Tadawul) Monday. Total comprehensive income dipped 3% to SAR5.7 million.

For the first six months of 2022, net profit fell 6.6% to SAR7 million, while total comprehensive income slipped 0.14% to SAR7.7 million.

References

External links

 —
 —
 Paper that an employee at SEC authored in 2017 on the effects of jointly reforming industrial fuel and residential electricity prices in Saudi Arabia.

Electric power companies of Saudi Arabia
Government-owned companies of Saudi Arabia
Energy companies established in 2000
Non-renewable resource companies established in 2000
Companies listed on Tadawul
Government-owned energy companies
Companies based in Riyadh
Saudi Arabian companies established in 2000
Electric power monopolies